KVTA (1590 AM) is a commercial radio station licensed to Ventura, California, and serves Ventura County and southern Santa Barbara County. The station is owned by Gold Coast Broadcasting and airs a talk radio format.

KVTA broadcasts with 5,000 watts from its transmitter near the Santa Clara River off the Ventura Freeway at South Victoria Avenue.  It uses a directional antenna at all times to protect other stations on 1590 AM.  It is also heard on 170 watt FM translator K250BV at 97.9 MHz.

Programming
Weekdays on KVTA begin with a local news and information show, hosted by Tom Spence and Rich Gualano.  The rest of the weekday schedule is made up of nationally syndicated conservative talk shows, including The Sean Hannity Show, The Clay Travis and Buck Sexton Show, The Ben Shapiro Show, The Chad Benson Show, The Jim Bohannon Show, Coast to Coast AM with George Noory and The Hugh Hewitt Show.

Weekend shows discuss topics such as money, health, real estate, technology and cars. Syndicated shows include The Kim Komando Show and The Mike Gallagher Show. Also featured are paid programming and repeats of some weekday shows.  Most hours begin with world and national news from Fox News Radio.

History

KUDU and KBBQ
On , the station first signed on the air.  Its original call sign was KUDU.  It was licensed to the cities of Ventura and Oxnard, California jointly.

In January 1973, KUDU changed its call letters to KBBQ. Featuring a country and western format, KBBQ served as the NBC Radio Network affiliate for Ventura County.

KOGO and KBBY
On February 1, 1985, the call sign switched to KOGO and the format flipped to adult contemporary music. As KOGO, the station changed hands twice. In July 1986, Forrest Radio sold KOGO and FM sister station KBBY to New York City-based ownership group Ventura Broadcasting Associates for $3 million.

That same group sold the combo three years later to Buena Ventura Inc., headed by George Duncan, for $6.7 million. KOGO renamed itself KBBY after its FM counterpart on September 17, 1993; the heritage KOGO call letters returned to the San Diego station then known as KKLQ the following year.

KXSP and KUNX
In December 1996, Buena Ventura Inc. sold the station, then using the KXSP calls and broadcasting in Spanish, along with KTND, to Gold Coast Broadcasting for $2 million. The transaction split the station from its longtime combo partner KBBY-FM which later would be owned by Cumulus Media.

From 1998 to 2004, the station held the KUNX call letters and aired a Spanish-language talk format under the "Radio Unica" branding. For a brief period in early 2004, it was known as KKOM and broadcast content from The American Comedy Network. The former KUNX and KKZZ then exchanged frequencies, with the KKZZ call letters landing on 1590 AM on March 5 and KUNX's Spanish programming resurfacing on 1400 AM.

During the 1590 AM frequency's second stint as KUNX starting in April 2008, it aired programming from Mexico-based news/talk network Radio Fórmula.

KVTA
In February 2013, the Radio Fórmula programs moved to Gold Coast Broadcasting sister station KKZZ on 1400 AM. That same month, KUNX began simulcasting English-language news/talk outlet KVTA, which at the time was on 1520 AM. On March 6, 2013, KUNX and KVTA swapped frequencies, sending the KUNX call letters to 1520 AM and KVTA to 1590 AM.

References

External links
FCC History Cards for KVTA

VTA
News and talk radio stations in the United States
Radio stations established in 1947
1947 establishments in California